It Means Everything is the first album by Save Ferris. It was released on September 9, 1997.

Track listing
All songs written by Brian Mashburn except where noted.
 "The World Is New" – 2:12
 "Nobody But Me" – 3:05
 "Superspy" – 3:00
 "Come on Eileen" (Kevin Rowland, Jim Paterson, Billy Adams) – 4:11
 "Goodbye" – 3:42
 "Sorry My Friend" – 3:05
 "Lies" (Mashburn, Monique Powell) – 3:54
 "Little Differences" (Mashburn, Powell) – 2:42
 "Spam" – 2:28 
 "Under 21" – 2:36 
 "Everything I Want To Be" (Mashburn, Powell) – 3:48

Personnel
 Monique Powell – Vocals, keyboards 
 Bill Uechi – Bass 
 Eric Zamora – Alto and tenor saxophone 
 Brian Mashburn – Guitar, vocals 
 T-Bone Willy – Trombone 
 José Castellaños – Trumpet 
 Marc Harismendy – Drums

Usage
The fourth song "Come on Eileen" was released as a single and is a cover of the Dexys Midnight Runners song.

References

Save Ferris albums
1997 debut albums
Epic Records albums